Swanpool Wood and Furnace Grove is a  biological Site of Special Scientific Interest (a conservation designation denoting a protected area in the United Kingdom), in Gloucestershire in South West England. The site is listed in the 'Forest of Dean Local Plan Review' as a Key Wildlife Site (KWS).

Location
It is in the Wye Valley Area of Outstanding Natural Beauty, an area of some importance in southern Great Britain, and supports many rare species. The woods and groves are important areas of woodland conservation work, coppicing and replanting. The semi-natural woodland is plentiful and continuous along the gorge.  There are two separate SSSI designations for the gorge being Lower Wye Gorge and Upper Wye Gorge.

Wye Valley Woodlands/ Coetiroedd Dyffryn Gwy are recognised as a Special Area of Conservation (SAC) under the EU Habitats Directive.

Flora
The site comprises a block of ancient broad-leaved woodland on Carboniferous limestone shales.  There is an Old Red Sandstone outcrop to the west. There are various streams and flushes in the north-east of Swanpool Wood. The growth reflects the nature of the soils.  The woodland is made up of Ash, Small-leaved Lime and Hazel. The damper areas support Alder.

Bramble, Dog's Mercury, Bluebell are prevalent in the ground flora together with ferns and ivy, Hart's-tongue and wavy hair-grass. Uncommon species include Herb Paris, Greater Butterfly Orchid and Narrow-leaved Bitter-cress.

References

External links
 Natural England (SSSI information)
 Revine Woods guide to the Wye Valley, with an article on Swanpool

Sites of Special Scientific Interest in Gloucestershire
Sites of Special Scientific Interest notified in 1984
River Wye